Never Too Much may refer to:

 Never Too Much (album), a 1981 album by Luther Vandross
 "Never Too Much" (song), the title song from the album
 "Never 2 Much of U", a 1989 song by Dino from the album 24/7